Cheryl Lynn Holdridge (née Phelps; June 20, 1944 – January 6, 2009) was an American actress, best known as an original cast member of The Mickey Mouse Club.

Early life
Holdridge was born in New Orleans, Louisiana. Her mother, Julie A. Phelps, was a dancer who performed on Broadway. Shortly after Cheryl was born, Julie moved with her new daughter to Burbank, California. In 1950, Julie married Herbert Charles Holdridge, a retired Brigadier General active in politics. He adopted Cheryl in 1953 and gave her his surname. Her stepbrother was diplomat John H. Holdridge, who served as U.S. Ambassador to Singapore and Indonesia.

Holdridge grew up in Sherman Oaks. She started dance lessons at an early age with Joyce Cole in North Hollywood, from whom she learned ballet and tap.

Career
Holdridge first performed professionally at the age of nine in the New York City Ballet's version of The Nutcracker in Los Angeles. Her first screen appearance was as an uncredited extra in the 1956 film production of Carousel.

She auditioned for Walt Disney's The Mickey Mouse Club in the spring of 1956, and was hired for the show's second season. Though a good dancer, her weak singing voice kept her in the background of most musical numbers. A competent actress with a pleasant speaking voice, she was employed for two of the show's episodic serials: Boys of the Western Sea and Annette.

After the show's run ended, Holdridge returned to Van Nuys High School and graduated from Grant High School with the winter 1961 class. She was cast in two episodes of Leave It to Beaver in 1959 as Gloria Cusick; she later played an occasional, recurring role as Wally Cleaver's girlfriend, Julie Foster. She reprised her role as Julie Foster in two guest appearances in The New Leave It to Beaver in 1985 and 1987.

From 1960, Holdridge made guest appearances on over twenty different shows, including The Rifleman, Wagon Train,  The Adventures of Ozzie and Harriet, My Three Sons, Bewitched, Bringing Up Buddy, The Dick Van Dyke Show and Bachelor Father.

Holdridge retired from acting in 1964 to marry race car driver Lance Reventlow, to whom she was wed until his death in 1972.

After the death of her third husband, Holdridge made a cameo appearance in the 2000 feature film, The Flintstones in Viva Rock Vegas. In 2005, she appeared at Disneyland for 50th anniversary celebrations of both the opening of the park and The Mickey Mouse Club. She was cast in televised documentary specials about Cary Grant (2005) and Barbara Hutton (2006), and also appeared in a special feature interview for a Disney DVD.

Personal life

In May 1960, Holdridge went on a live tour to Australia with other former Mouseketeers. While there, she became involved with Lucky Starr, an Australian singer.  She was later linked in fan magazines and gossip columns with many other celebrities, including Elvis Presley.

Holdridge's first marriage, on November 8, 1964, was to sportsman and playboy Lance Reventlow. Reventlow, a pilot, died in 1972, in the crash of a small plane in which he was a passenger in Aspen, Colorado. She had the title Gräfin von Haugwitz-Hardenberg-Reventlow. 
  
Her second husband was Albert James "Jim" Skarda. They married in 1974. He ran a car rental service in Aspen. They divorced in 1988. She maintained a second home in Aspen and lived there for six months out of the year from the late 1960s to the mid-1990s.

Her third husband, Manning J. Post (1918–2000), a prominent California Democratic Party fundraiser and controller, was 26 years her senior. He died at the age of 82.

Death
Holdridge died at her Santa Monica home on January 6, 2009, from lung cancer, aged 64.

Filmography

References

13. Cheryl Holdridge Graduation picture, 1961 Grant High School https://www.classmates.com/siteui/yearbooks/124952?page=31

External links

 
 
 Images of Holdridge from her appearance on Bewitched
  Cheryl Holdridge, before and after the Mickey Mouse Club
  Cheryl Holdridge profile

1944 births
2009 deaths
20th-century American actresses
21st-century American actresses
Actresses from New Orleans
People from Sherman Oaks, Los Angeles
American child actresses
American environmentalists
American women environmentalists
American film actresses
American television actresses
Deaths from lung cancer in California
Mouseketeers
Van Nuys High School alumni
Woolworth family
Grant High School (Los Angeles) alumni
Actresses from Los Angeles
Racing drivers' wives and girlfriends